Brigadier-General Robert Black Fell CB CBE (5 November 1859 – 22 March 1934) was the 4th Commander of the Ceylon Defence Force. He was appointed on 1 June 1913 until 6 March 1914, and again until 31 December 1919. He was succeeded by the acting W. G. B. Dickson and again by Thomas Howard Chapman.

References

Commanders of the Ceylon Defence Force
Cameronians officers
Companions of the Order of the Bath
British Army generals of World War I
Commanders of the Order of the British Empire
1859 births
1934 deaths
Military personnel from Cumberland